Stiphodon larson is a species of goby found in Papua New Guinea.
  
This species can reach a length of  SL.

Etymology
The fish is named in honor of Helen K. Larson, the Curator of Fishes at the Museum and Art Gallery of the Northern Territory in Darwin, Australia.

References

larson
Taxa named by Ronald E. Watson
Fish described in 1996